Marius Rapalis (born 22 March 1983 in Vilnius) is a Lithuanian retired professional football goalkeeper.

International career
Rapalis was called up to the senior Lithuania squad for a friendly against Poland in June 2016.

References

External links

Profile at futbolinis.lt

1983 births
Living people
Lithuanian footballers
Association football goalkeepers
Lithuanian expatriate footballers
Expatriate footballers in Ukraine
Expatriate footballers in Belarus
Expatriate footballers in Latvia
Lithuanian expatriate sportspeople in Ukraine
Lithuanian expatriate sportspeople in Belarus
Lithuanian expatriate sportspeople in Latvia
A Lyga players
Belarusian Premier League players
Latvian Higher League players
FK Žalgiris players
SC Tavriya Simferopol players
FK Vėtra players
FK Sūduva Marijampolė players
FC Šiauliai players
FC Neman Grodno players
FK Riteriai players
FK Spartaks Jūrmala players